En Priyame is a 1983 Indian Tamil-language film directed by Sivakumar, starring Raveendran and Viji .

Cast

Raveendran
Viji

Soundtrack

The music was composed by Gangai Amaran.

References

1983 films
1980s Tamil-language films
Films scored by Gangai Amaran